Emprise to Avalon is the fifth studio album by the German melodic death metal band Suidakra.

Track listing 
 "Darkane Times" – 5:47
 "Dinas Emrys" – 1:54
 "Pendragon's Fall" – 5:32
 "The Highking" – 4:00
 "The Spoils of Annwn" – 1:48
 "The Quest" – 5:19
 "And the Giants Dance..." – 5:14
 "Song of the Graves" – 5:13
 "Still the Pipes Are Calling" – 5:17

Personnel 
 Arkadius Antonik – lead, rhythm, melodic, acoustic guitars, bass, keyboards & main vocals
 Marcel Schoenen – melodic, acoustic guitars, tin whistle & clean vocals
 Lars Wehner – drums & percussion
 Germano Sanna - guitars (Live)
 Marcus Riewaldt- bass (Live)
 Andy and Schösch Classen – engineering
 Ulf Horbelt - mastering
 Kris Verwimp - covert art
 Nils Bross - Suidakra logo
 Torsten Reitemeier - band photos
 Tim Siebrecht - guest backing vocals on The High King and Darkane Times

References 
 Track list and lyrics on suidakra.com

2002 albums
Suidakra albums